Jeremiah Murphy (16 March 1907 – 1992) was a Welsh professional footballer who played as an inside forward. He played in the Football League for Merthyr Town, Cardiff City, Fulham and Crystal Palace.

References

1907 births
1992 deaths
People from Dowlais
Sportspeople from Merthyr Tydfil County Borough
Welsh footballers
Merthyr Town F.C. players
Cardiff City F.C. players
Fulham F.C. players
Crystal Palace F.C. players
Barry Town United F.C. players
Troedyrhiw F.C. players
English Football League players
Association football inside forwards